Tahar Chaïbi (17 February 1946 – 29 April 2014) was a Tunisian footballer who played as a midfielder for Club Africain and the national team. He was born in Tunis, Tunisia.

Chaïbi died from complications from a stroke, aged 68.

References

1946 births
2014 deaths
Tunisian footballers
Tunisia international footballers
Club Africain players
Association football midfielders
1965 African Cup of Nations players
Footballers from Tunis